List of Disgaea video games contains a list of games in the  video game series of tactical role-playing games created and developed by Nippon Ichi. The series debuted in Japan on January 30, 2003, with Disgaea: Hour of Darkness, later re-released as Disgaea: Afternoon of Darkness and Disgaea DS. One of Nippon Ichi's most popular franchises, it has branched off into both a  manga and light novel series, as well as an anime. The Disgaea games take place in a fictional universe called the Netherworld and are known for their uncommon RPG elements, such as complex gameplay, extremely high maximum stats, a maximum level of 9999, and humorous, frequently referential dialogue. Main characters in the series often include cynical, power-hungry antiheroes forced to fight alongside heroic foils, much to their disdain. Games in the Disgaea series have been critically acclaimed and received multiple awards.

Main series

Spin-off titles

See also
 Makai Senki Disgaea, an anime adaptation of the series

References

 
Disgaea